Micraloa lineola is a moth of the family Erebidae. It was described by Johan Christian Fabricius in 1793. It is found in India, Nepal, Sri Lanka and Myanmar.

In, The Fauna of British India, Including Ceylon and Burma: Moths Volume II, the species is described with Micraloa emittens, as follows:

References

Moths described in 1793
Spilosomina
Moths of Asia